Lecanora hybocarpa is a species of crustose lichen in the family Lecanoraceae. Originally described in 1849 as a species of Parmelia, it was transferred to Lecanora in 1984 by Irwin Brodo.

See also
List of Lecanora species

References

Lichens described in 1849
Lichen species
Lichens of North America
hybocarpa
Taxa named by Edward Tuckerman